Port Jefferson Village Historic District is a national historic district located at Port Jefferson in Suffolk County, New York.  The district contains 98 contributing buildings.  It includes a mix of residences, commercial buildings, and a church.  The district is primarily residential dating from 1800 to 1915, with a majority built from the 1840s to 1870s in the Greek Revival and Italianate styles.

It was added to the National Register of Historic Places in 2005.

References

External links
Port Jefferson Village Historic District (Living Places)

Historic districts on the National Register of Historic Places in New York (state)
Federal architecture in New York (state)
Port Jefferson, New York
Historic districts in Suffolk County, New York
National Register of Historic Places in Suffolk County, New York